The following is a list of songs written about Dhaka, the capital city of Bangladesh:
"Dhaka 86" - title song of Bangladeshi film Dhaka 86
"Meghe Dhaka Shohor" - Habib Wahid and Nirjhor
"Dhaka Shohor Aisha Amar" - sung by Shammi Akhtar in the film Ashikkhito (1978)
"Jitbe Dhaka Dekhbe Desh" - theme song of the Dhaka Dynamites cricket team
"Meghe Dhaka Chand" - sung by Nodi

References

Dhaka
Culture in Dhaka
Songs